Larkya La is one of the longest passes in the Himalaya of Nepal, situated at  above the sea level. It is located in between Dharmashala and Bimthang, and is the highest point in the Manaslu Circuit Trek.

References

External links
  Includes annotated photos and panoramas of the route to/from the pass

Mountain passes by range
Geography of Nepal
Dharamshala
Hiking trails in Nepal